Lyle is an unincorporated community and census-designated place (CDP) in Klickitat County, Washington, United States. The population was 499 at the 2010 census.

History 

Established around 1859, the community was originally called "Klickitat Landing". The first European settler was Egbert French, who arrived from Ohio. In 1866, French sold his holdings to James O. Lyle from The Dalles, Oregon, who moved to the north bank of the Columbia River.

A post office was soon established with Lyle as the first postmaster, and with mail delivered by steamer from the opposite shore. Steamboat operation lasted until the North Shore Railroad was completed. When the Spokane, Portland and Seattle Railway came to town in 1907, its line passed somewhat north of the town. The present townsite was plotted in 1909, and the older townsite became known as "downtown". In 1941 there was a small airport in Lyle.

Lyle today

Lyle has two main areas: that part which is built on the north bank of the Columbia River, including the downtown, and that part which is built on the hills above the river. The downtown area has one grocery store (which is a super-sized quick-mart), two churches, a museum, a tavern, a restaurant/cafe, a gas station and vehicle repair shop, a second-hand store, an espresso stand, and a historic hotel with restaurant and bar. Other small businesses come and go, and all are located in the downtown area.

Residential areas flank downtown and extend east and west. Newer residences have sprung up on the northern hill overlooking downtown, with row upon row of homes on terraces. Less than 30 years ago, there were fewer than half a dozen homes on the entire hill. Now there are dozens, all seemingly vying for the best view of the Columbia River. Prices for hillside property are high for such a small town, and are based primarily on the view.

The Lyle Community Schools Campus includes three independent, small, rural schools: the area's elementary, middle school and high school, which incorporate students from Dallesport and Murdock. ( east of Lyle) The campus is located at the northernmost part of town, high on the hill overlooking Lyle. The student body is small and combines with nearby towns to make up teams for some sports.

Although tiny, somewhat rustic, and usually quiet, Lyle has attracted some attention because it lies very near several popular windsurfing beaches, including Doug's Beach. The area is also home to six boutique wineries: Cor Cellars, Domaine Pouillon, Jacob Williams Winery, Klickitat Canyon Winery, Tetrahedron Wines and Syncline.

Geography 
Lyle is located in southwestern Klickitat County at  (45.695845, -121.282279), on the north side of the Columbia River where it is joined by the Klickitat River. Dallesport and White Salmon are the locations of the closest road crossings of the Columbia River to the east and west, respectively. In addition, State Route 142 travels from Lyle to  Goldendale along the Klickitat River.

Behind the town, most of the land consists of hills leading to a large plateau that is commonly found in south-central Washington.

Climate
This region experiences warm (but not hot) and dry summers, with no average monthly temperatures above . According to the Köppen Climate Classification system, Lyle has a warm-summer Mediterranean climate, abbreviated "Csb" on climate maps.

Demographics 
As of the census of 2000, there were 530 people, 221 households, and 152 families residing in the CDP. The population density was 156.5 people per square mile (60.4/km2). There were 260 housing units at an average density of 76.8/sq mi (29.6/km2). The racial makeup of the CDP was 87.55% White, 1.89% Native American, 0.94% Asian, 0.38% Pacific Islander, 4.91% from other races, and 4.34% from two or more races. Hispanic or Latino of any race were 7.55% of the population.

There were 221 households, out of which 31.7% had children under the age of 18 living with them, 51.6% were married couples living together, 13.1% had a female householder with no husband present, and 30.8% were non-families. 25.8% of all households were made up of individuals, and 12.2% had someone living alone who was 65 years of age or older. The average household size was 2.34 and the average family size was 2.76.

In the CDP, the population was spread out, with 26.8% under the age of 18, 7.4% from 18 to 24, 25.1% from 25 to 44, 25.3% from 45 to 64, and 15.5% who were 65 years of age or older. The median age was 41 years. For every 100 females, there were 100.0 males. For every 100 females age 18 and over, there were 99.0 males.

The median income for a household in the CDP was $33,438, and the median income for a family was $40,083. Males had a median income of $37,292 versus $25,500 for females. The per capita income for the CDP was $17,355. About 8.1% of families and 11.6% of the population were below the poverty line, including 8.2% of those under age 18 and 20.6% of those age 65 or over.

See also 
Lavina Washines

References

External links
community.gorge.net/lyle

Census-designated places in Klickitat County, Washington
Census-designated places in Washington (state)
Columbia River Gorge
Washington (state) populated places on the Columbia River